Hakeem Ayodeji Ayodele Craig Araba (born 12 February 1991) is an English professional footballer who plays as a striker for Qviding.

Career

Araba started his youth career at the age of 17 with Peterborough United. He then signed his first professional contract at the age of 18 at Dagenham & Redbridge. While playing at Dagenham, he went on loan to Thurrock and Redbridge. After leaving Dagenham he played 7 games with  Bishop's Stortford, before moving to Billericay Town.

In 2013, Araba then headed southwards to Cyprus and AEK Kouklia before a short stint with Ermis Aradippou in July 2014, appearing in a UEFA Europa League qualifier against Young Boys. he moved to Greek Panthrakikos.
From Greece Araba moved to Sweden, he signed a contract with Falkenbergs FF where he was known as "Superman" by the fans.
Araba finished the season of 2015 as the top goal scorer for his club.

In February 2017 Araba signed for Danish team, Næstved. Six months later, he moved to Örgryte in Sweden.

In January 2019, Araba joined Oberliga side Koblenz.

On 23 August 2019, Araba returned to Cyprus to join Cypriot Second Division side Akritas Chlorakas.

On 11 September 2020, Araba headed back to Sweden after more than two years to join Division 1 Södra side Qviding.

Personal life
Araba was born in England and is of Nigerian descent.

References

External links

1991 births
Living people
English footballers
English people of Nigerian descent
Association football forwards
People from the London Borough of Waltham Forest
Peterborough United F.C. players
Dagenham & Redbridge F.C. players
Thurrock F.C. players
Redbridge F.C. players
Bishop's Stortford F.C. players
Billericay Town F.C. players
East Thurrock United F.C. players
Bromley F.C. players
Whitehawk F.C. players
Lowestoft Town F.C. players
AEK Kouklia F.C. players
Ermis Aradippou FC players
Panthrakikos F.C. players
Falkenbergs FF players
Örgryte IS players
TuS Koblenz players
Akritas Chlorakas players
National League (English football) players
Isthmian League players
Super League Greece players
Cypriot First Division players
Cypriot Second Division players
Allsvenskan players
Black British sportsmen
English expatriate footballers
English expatriate sportspeople in Cyprus
English expatriate sportspeople in Greece
English expatriate sportspeople in Sweden
Expatriate footballers in Cyprus
Expatriate footballers in Greece
Expatriate footballers in Sweden
English expatriate sportspeople in Finland
Kemi City F.C. players
English expatriate sportspeople in Denmark
Ettan Fotboll players
Qviding FIF players